Santa Clara County Federal Credit Union, also known as County Federal, is a credit union which offers membership to both employees and retirees of certain Santa Clara County, California, businesses, as well as their relatives. Like other United States credit unions, it is a non-profit organization founded for the purpose of providing service to its members and is funded by its members.

Services
SCCFCU provides many products and services to its members, including loans, savings, discounts, and checking. Also, due to its non-profit nature, it can usually provide an average lower loan interest rate and higher savings interest rate than most for-profit organizations because any profit made is used for the benefit of its members rather than kept.

Membership
County Federal serves people employed by their corporate partners in Santa Clara County, California, as it did in the past, and also employees of their corporate partners in San Benito County. Some of their most notable corporate partners include Santa Clara County Office of Education, Valley Medical Center, and the state of California. Membership is also available to the spouses, children, parents, siblings, grandparents, grandchildren, step-siblings, stepchildren, legal adoptees, and legal adopters of current and retired members. Other persons living with and maintaining a single economic unit with active and former members are also eligible, subject to verification.

Statistics
SCCFCU, holding federal charter #24299, is one of the largest credit unions in the San Francisco Bay Area, with US $500 million in assets and roughly 43,000 members. On average, it holds $280 million in loans, employs 112 people, and employs one person for every t391 members. The bank has an average Net Worth Ratio of 11.03%, Percent Loan Growth of -7.56%, Loan/Assets Ratio of 55:13, and Investments/Assets Ratio of 40 to 29.

Funding
Santa Clara County Federal Credit Union is funded, as most banks are, through its members' participation, however, it is insured by and can draw money from the National Credit Union Share Insurance Fund in emergencies. It isn't, however, a member of the Federal Deposit Insurance Corporation.

History
County Federal was founded on May 8, 1950, by eight county employees with only $107. These employees worked for free, volunteering their own time to establish the company. It was originally called the Santa Clara County Employees Credit Union and was first located at 1090 N. First Street in San Jose, California. In 1987, the union was federally chartered through the National Credit Union Administration, and in 1997, it reached $200 million in assets, placing it in the top three percent of US credit unions by assets.

Branches

References

External links
 Santa Clara County Federal Credit Union Website
 Profile
 History

Credit unions based in California
Non-profit organizations based in the San Francisco Bay Area
Companies based in San Jose, California
1950 establishments in California